is a yaoi manga illustrated by Kazuhiko Mishima. It follows the love-hate relationship between the wealthy boy Kei Ichijou and his teacher Satoru Hayashi. It adapted into Drama CDs.

Plot
Kei Ichijou is the son of a famous and powerful family. He's disgusted by everyone always sucking up to him, even teachers. But the new teacher Satoru Hayashi isn't interested in Ichijou's family connections, in fact he doesn't seem to like him at all!

Characters
Kei Ichijou is the rich boy of the wealthy Ichijou family. He have a love-hate relationship with Satoru Hayashi whom he affectionately calls "Ringo". 
Satoru "Ringo" Hayashi is the new teacher of Kei. He doesn't like him because he's rich but later warms up to him after he stands up to Itsuki.
Ken Yone is one of Kei's friends. He adores Hayashi-sensei a lot and calls Kei "Icchan".
Ryu Mitsui is one of Kei's friends. He is emotionless and only reads books.
Hajime Ninomiya is Kei's rival for Hayashi-sensei's affections. He have sorts of feelings for Yone after Yone punches him in the face for bullying Kei.
Itsuki is the antagonist of the series and another teacher. He is the responsible of why Satoru Hayashi hates rich kids and rapes Satoru in 10 years ago.

Manga series
2007 manga
Yaoi anime and manga
Comedy anime and manga